Edson Correia de Araujo, better known as Éder (Maceió - Alagoas, 10 June 1988), is a Brazilian footballer who plays as a defensive midfielder for São Bento.

Club career

Spartak Trnava
Edson made his professional Fortuna Liga debut for Spartak Trnava against DAC Dunajská Streda on 24 July 2016.

References

External links
 FC Spartak Trnava official club profile
 
 Éder at playmakerstats.com (English version of ogol.com.br)
 Futbalnet profile

1988 births
Living people
Brazilian footballers
Brazilian expatriate footballers
Association football midfielders
FC Spartak Trnava players
Slovak Super Liga players
Brazilian expatriate sportspeople in Slovakia
Expatriate footballers in Slovakia
Footballers from São Paulo
Rio Claro Futebol Clube players
Grêmio Novorizontino players